Gormaki is a rural locality (a khutor) in Revolyutsionnoye Rural Settlement, Pallasovsky District, Volgograd Oblast, Russia. The population was 180 as of 2010. There are 5 streets.

Geography 
Gormaki is located on the Caspian Depression, 101 km southwest of Pallasovka (the district's administrative centre) by road. Sadovoye is the nearest rural locality.

References 

Rural localities in Pallasovsky District